2012: Kurse a di Xtabai (Curse of the Xtabai) is an 80-minute Belizean Creole-language supernatural thriller and the first major feature length dramatic movie to be entirely made in Belize.  It was directed by Matthiew Klinck and selected as the opening night movie of the 2012 Belize International Film Festival.  It was then taken on a national tour around the country and projected for audiences on an inflatable screen. The movie was made with an entirely Belizean cast, some of which had never acted before.

Cast
 Miriam Antoinette-Ochaeta as Mom
 Arran Bevis as John Jones
 Nicasio Coc as Mayan Elder
 Ian Flowers as Ian
 Shelley Glionna as Xtabai
 Robert Grieg as Bobby
 Esmeralda Hernandez as America
 Roseli Hernandez as Hollywood
 Nehanda Higinio as Nehanda
 Memory Magdaleno as Memory
 Edgardo Serrut as Edgardo

References

External links 
 

2012 films
Belizean films
Creole-language mass media
2010s supernatural thriller films
Films shot in Belize
Films set in Belize
Films shot in Central America
Jungle adventure films